Ponornytsia is an urban-type settlement in Novhorod-Siverskyi Raion, Chernihiv Oblast, Ukraine. It hosts the administration of Ponornytsia settlement hromada, one of the hromadas of Ukraine. Population: 

The settlement is located on the banks of the Bahachka River, in the drainage basin of the Desna. It lies on the western border of Mezynskyi National Nature Park.

Until 18 July 2020, Ponornytsia belonged to Korop Raion. The raion was abolished in July 2020 as part of the administrative reform of Ukraine, which reduced the number of raions of Chernihiv Oblast to five. The area of Korop Raion was merged into Novhorod-Siverskyi Raion.

Economy

Transportation
Ponornytsia has a road access to Highway M02 which connects Kyiv with Hlukhiv and with the Russian border, as well as to Highway H27, connecting Chernihiv and Novhorod-Siverskyi.

References

Krolevetsky Uyezd
Urban-type settlements in Novhorod-Siverskyi Raion